Major General ASM Ridwanur Rahman, awc, afwc, psc, G is a two-star general of the Bangladesh Army. He is currently serving as the Commandant of Bangladesh Institute of Peace Support Operation Training (BIPSOT). Before serving at BIPSOT, he was the president of Bangladesh Army Sports Control Board.

Career 
Ridwan was commissioned in Bangladesh Army on 21 December 1990 with 23rd BMA Long Course. He has served as Director of Directorate of Military Training at Army headquarters as Brigadier General. He was the member of National Olympic Academy Committee. Under his command BIPSOT arranged "Exercise Tiger Lightning 2022" in partnership with the Bangladesh Armed Forces and the Oregon National Guard.

References 

Bangladesh Army generals
Living people
Bangladeshi military personnel
Bangladeshi generals
Year of birth missing (living people)